Potter Township may refer to:

 Potter Township, Polk County, Arkansas, in Polk County, Arkansas
 Potter Township, Barnes County, North Dakota
 Potter Township, Beaver County, Pennsylvania
 Potter Township, Centre County, Pennsylvania

Township name disambiguation pages